Pruines is a commune in the Aveyron department in southern France.

The Château de Pruines is a castle dating to the 15th century, much modified over the centuries.

Population

See also
Communes of the Aveyron department

References

Communes of Aveyron
Aveyron communes articles needing translation from French Wikipedia